The Undertaker and His Pals is a 1966 American horror comedy film directed by T. L. P. Swicegood.  The film stars Warrene Ott; James Westmoreland, billed under the name "Rad Fulton"; Robert Lowery, billed as "Guest Star"; and Ray Dannis as The Undertaker. It features Marty Friedman, Sally Frei and Rick Cooper.

Plot
A motorcycle-riding undertaker and his two biker pals create business for the funeral parlor by selecting a victim at random from the telephone book and gruesomely murdering them.  The undertaker then overcharges the victim's families for the cheap, shoddy funerals he provides.  One of the two bikers is a medical student who chops up the victim's bodies to further his studies.  A private detective who has lost two secretaries to the gang pursues them, but is killed by a bomb left by the undertaker. Finally, the police step in and save two other women from falling victim to the gang.

At the end of the film, all of the actors playing the supposedly dead characters "come alive" again, one by one.

Production
Production began on September 13, 1965. Studio filming took place at Alpha Omega Studios in Glendale, California, while location scenes were shot in Los Angeles and Glendale.

Release
The Undertaker and His Pals premiered in Birmingham, Alabama on November 30, 1966. Originally, some gore scenes were created with the insertion of real medical surgery footage. When acquired by Ted V Mikels for a triple bill of the Italian horror movie The Embalmer and his own film The Corpse Grinders, he cut out the majority of the gore scenes and a sequence with Ray Dannis in drag as an old lady. Reported in some sources as approximately 80 minutes in length, Mikels' cut of the film ran a little over an hour. It was released on home video by MTI Home Video and, since then, as part of many public domain DVD sets.

Reception
Variety stated that the film "borrowed every gimmick from horror and macabre comedy films, with a resultant mish-mash which is difficult to appraise viewer-wise."

In a retrospective review, Fred Beldin of AllMovie described the film as an "incredibly weird horror comedy", noting unfunny jokes and unrealistic gore with hammy acting but that the film "revels in its own inappropriateness so completely that it's impossible to forget."  and that it was "highly recommended for those who revel in bad taste."

Censorship
Police in Louisville, Kentucky confiscated a print of the film based on a local law which banned "the publication of materials dealing with bloodshed, lust or crime."  After the statute was declared to be unconstitutional by the Louisville Quarterly Court, the print was returned.

In Clarksville, Indiana a local Parents-Teachers Association and a number of women's groups complained about the film, and the theater cancelled showings.

References

External links
 
 

1966 horror films
1966 films
American comedy horror films
Films shot in Los Angeles
American splatter films
American exploitation films
1960s exploitation films
1960s English-language films
1960s American films